Vestaburg S.C. was an amateur U.S. soccer team which existed during the early twentieth century.  Based out of Vestaburg, Pennsylvania, little is known about the team and its history other than it won the 1925 West Penn Challenge Cup, went to the quarterfinals of the 1925 National Challenge Cup and produced three members of the National Soccer Hall of Fame.  One of those members, Ralph Caraffi began his career in 1915 with Vestaburg.  The other two, Johnny Jaap and Mike Bookie, played for the team at unknown times.

References

Defunct soccer clubs in Pennsylvania